The redline pufferfish (Tetraodon pustulatus) is a species of pufferfish native to the Cross River in Nigeria.

References

redline pufferfish
Freshwater fish of West Africa
redline pufferfish